Pioneer Bay is a waterway in Qikiqtaaluk Region, Nunavut, Canada. It lies off the southwestern coast of Devon Island in the eastern high Arctic. Like Baring Bay to the south and Prince Alfred Bay to the north, it is an arm of Wellington Channel.

History
In 1908, Frederick Cook, an American explorer and physician, explored in this region.

References

Bays of Qikiqtaaluk Region